The 2021 IFAF Men's Flag Football World Championships was the 10th World Championships in men's flag football. The tournament took place in Jerusalem, Israel, from 6 to 8 December 2021.

Venue

Tournament groups 
After the group ballot, 21 teams are divided into 3 groups of 5 a 1 group of 6. In the group stage each team plays each other once, while the second stage of the event includes play-offs and placement matches.

The two best teams of each group advance to the quarter-finals.

Results

Preliminary Round

Group A

Group B

Group C

Group D

Knock-out stage

Placement matches

5th Place Bracket

9th Place Bracket

13th Place Bracket

17th Place Bracket

Ranking and statistics

Final ranking
The top seven teams, not including the United States, qualified for the 2022 World Games.

References

External links 
 Official website

IFAF World Championship
Flag Football World Championship
IFAF
International sports competitions hosted by Israel
Sport in Jerusalem